The 1991 Louisville Cardinals football team represented the University of Louisville as an independent during the 1991 NCAA Division I-A football season. Led by seventh-year head coach Howard Schnellenberger, the Cardinals compiled a record of 2–9. The team played their home games in Cardinal Stadium in Louisville, Kentucky.

Schedule

Roster

Team players in the NFL Draft

References

Louisville
Louisville Cardinals football seasons
Louisville Cardinals football